Saratoga Township is located in Marshall County, Illinois. As of the 2010 census, its population was 286 and it contained 135 housing units. Saratoga Township formed from a portion of Whitefield Township sometime before 1860.

Geography

Demographics

References

External links
City-data.com
Illinois State Archives

Townships in Marshall County, Illinois
Peoria metropolitan area, Illinois
Townships in Illinois